IFK Lidingö is a Swedish sports club, part of the IFK system, based on the island of Lidingö outside Stockholm. Although the club takes part in numerous sports, it is most famous for its football, athletics and orienteering sections. The football team are called IFK Lidingö FK.

The club was founded in 1932 and in 1985 it became an alliance club with independent sections. It currently has 400 members, most of them under around 15 years of age. The club arranges Lidingöloppet, which attracts nationwide attention.

Athletics 
Most notable among former athletes at the club is Ludmila Engquist and Mattias Sunneborn.

Football 
Famous former football players include Mikael Dorsin and Magnus Pehrsson.

Orienteering 
The club won the 10-mila relay in 1951, the women's relay in 10-mila in 2010 and 25-manna in 1999. The runners became world champions: Lucie Böhm (1997) and Graham Gristwood (2008). Other runners are: Marthe Andersson, Annika Billstam, Mårten Boström, Holger Hott, Fredrik Bakkman, Signe Søes and Chris Terkelsen.

References

External links
Football Section
Athletics Section
Orienteering Section

Sports teams in Sweden
Idrottsföreningen Kamraterna
1932 establishments in Sweden
Sports clubs established in 1932
Orienteering clubs in Sweden